The grey sunbird or mouse-coloured sunbird (Cyanomitra verreauxii) is a species of bird in the family Nectariniidae.
It is found in Eswatini, Kenya, Malawi, Mozambique, Somalia, South Africa, and Tanzania.

References

External links
 Species text in The Atlas of Southern African Birds.

grey sunbird
Birds of East Africa
Birds of Southern Africa
grey sunbird
Taxonomy articles created by Polbot